Amy Kame (born February 14, 1992) is an American professional basketball player for the Townsville Fire in the WNBL.

Career

High school 
Kame played basketball at Central High School in Grand Junction, Colorado. In her senior year, she was named the MaxPreps Colorado Player of the Year for class 5A. The organization stated that,  "Kame was the most complete player in the classification, as well as the most consistent throughout the season".

College
After high school, Kame played college basketball at the University of San Diego for the Toreros in San Diego, California.

San Diego statistics

Source

Australia
After college, Kame began her professional career in Finland, in the Naisten Korisliiga. In 2015, she then travelled to Australia and signed with the Hobart Chargers in the South East Australian Basketball League. She then moved to the Nunawading Spectres for the 2016 season. Kame signed with the Townsville Fire in Australia for the 2016–17 WNBL season, the two-time defending champions.

References

1992 births
Living people
American expatriate basketball people in Australia
American expatriate basketball people in Finland
American women's basketball players
Guards (basketball)
People from Grand Junction, Colorado
San Diego Toreros women's basketball players